Parliamentary elections were held in Slovakia on 20 and 21 September 2002. The Movement for a Democratic Slovakia remained the largest party in the National Council, winning 36 of the 150 seats. Mikuláš Dzurinda of the Slovak Democratic and Christian Union remained Prime Minister, in coalition with the Party of the Hungarian Coalition, Christian Democratic Movement, and Alliance of the New Citizen parties.

Participating parties

Results

References

External links
Official results
Slovak Election Data Project

Parliamentary elections in Slovakia
Slovakia
2002 in Slovakia
September 2002 events in Europe